On 6 December 1990, an MB-326 military jet of the Italian Air Force crashed into a school building at Casalecchio di Reno, near Bologna,  Italy, killing twelve students and injuring 88 other students and staff. The aircraft had been abandoned minutes earlier by its pilot, who ejected following an on-board fire and loss of control.

The pilot and two senior air force officers were later put on trial and found guilty of involuntary manslaughter, receiving a sentence of two and half years in prison, but were subsequently acquitted on appeal.

Accident 
The only person on board was the pilot, Sub-lieutenant Bruno Viviani, 24, with 740 flight hours of experience, of which 140 were in the MB-326.

The planned route involved overflying the village of Borgoforte before heading towards the town of Rovigo. At 10:22a.m., the engine started developing problems, prompting the pilot to abort the mission and seek to land. The nearest airfield, at Ferrara, had only a 600-metre-long runway, which was insufficient.

At 10:31a.m., while approaching Bologna, Viviani reported total engine failure, fire on board and flight controls unresponsive. After attempting to steer the aircraft towards open fields, he ejected and landed near Ceretolo, a village next to Casalecchio di Reno, suffering three fractured vertebrae.

An eyewitness at Bologna Airport reported seeing the aircraft on a normal approach path and with the landing gear extended. He then observed flames and white smoke coming out of the engine nozzle, before seeing the aircraft turning in the opposite direction to the airfield, the smoke turning black, and the pilot ejecting from the aircraft, which the eyewitness managed to photograph. The ejection and the flight of the aircraft for the following few seconds were also captured on video by the cameraman of a local TV station, Rete 7, who was filming in the area and happened to notice the unfolding disaster.

At 10:33a.m., the pilotless aircraft crashed through the window of a first-floor classroom of the Gaetano Salvemini Technical Institute, a high school in Casalecchio, where a German class was about to finish. At that time, 285 students, 28 teachers and 4 staff were in the building, 17 of whom were in the classroom.

Aircraft 

The aircraft involved was an Aermacchi MB-326, a single-engine, two-seater jet trainer of the Italian Air Force, with registration number MM54386. It was part of the 3º Stormo (3rd Wing) based at Verona-Villafranca. Of the 136 aircraft delivered to the Italian Air Force starting from 1960, at the time of the accident only 58 survived, and they had already been replaced as trainer aircraft by the more modern MB-339. By then the MB-326 was used only to quickly connect airbases, tow targets and for miscellaneous roles such as in the accident flight.

Aftermath 

The impact created a seven-metre-wide hole in the outer wall and set the classroom on fire. The fuselage and engine careered across the room and crashed through the back wall, sending flames and smoke through the rest of the building and trapping several people on the upper floor.

The emergency services arrived at the scene within minutes. A tradesman that was passing by in his van stopped and used his ladder to evacuate the first survivors. Several people jumped to the ground in panic from the upper floors of the building and were injured. The fire brigade then completed the evacuation of the building within half an hour, while paramedics administered first aid on the school's lawn to several injured.

Casualties 

Of the sixteen pupils present in the classroom at the time of the crash, all aged 15, twelve – eleven girls and one boy – were killed in the impact and fire; only four survived: three girls and one boy. The teacher who was giving the lesson survived as well, despite suffering severe burns. Eighty-eight other people were injured: 82 students and 6 adults. Of all the injured, 72 suffered permanent disability of varying degrees.

One of the survivors from the classroom, a girl, was trapped under a wing of the jet, and was found only after all other survivors had been evacuated from the building, when the fire crews heard her cries for help. Some of the victims' bodies were burnt beyond recognition, and could be identified by parents and staff members only by looking at items of clothing or jewellery.

Investigation and trial 

At the time of the event, Italy's aviation safety agency (Agenzia Nazionale per la Sicurezza del Volo) had not yet been established, and the investigation into the accident was carried out by the public prosecutor's office. Viviani and two air force colonels – the commander of the 3rd Wing and the officer in charge of Villafranca airbase – were charged with multiple counts of involuntary manslaughter and culpable air disaster.

The prosecution argued that as soon as the engine started developing troubles, while near Ferrara, the pilot should have directed the aircraft to the east towards the Adriatic Sea and then ejected, instead of heading south towards Bologna airport, close to a densely populated area. According to the prosecution, the two other officers, who throughout the incident were in radio contact with Viviani from Villafranca, failed to give him proper instructions for a safe resolution of the emergency. In February 1995, they were all found guilty and sentenced to two and a half years in prison.

In January 1997, the Court of Appeal overturned the sentence, ruling that no crime had been committed, and that the conduct of the three defendants during the incident was faultless. In January 1998, the Court of Cassation, Italy's highest court of appeal, rejected the prosecution's request to annul the appeal verdict, therefore definitively confirming the defendants' acquittal.

Legacy 

The tragedy left a profound mark on the local community of Casalecchio and surrounding towns. Four different victims' associations were created in the wake of the disaster, which in 1997 merged into the Associazione Vittime del Salvemini – 6 dicembre 1990 (Salvemini Victims Association – 6 December 1990). Many survivors and relatives of the victims rejected the outcome of the trial, and maintained that justice had not been done.

The building struck by the jet remained closed for over ten years. In 2001, it was repaired and reopened as Casa della Solidarietà "Alexander Dubček" (House of Solidarity "Alexander Dubček"), a public building hosting the local unit of the Protezione Civile (Italian Civil Protection) and the office of various local charities, including the victims association. The gaping hole in the wall left by the impact was preserved, closed only by a glass pane, and the classroom hit by the aircraft was turned into a memorial to the victims. In September 2020, the building was returned to school use for the first time in thirty years, after the COVID-19 pandemic forced schools to find more classroom space to ensure social distancing.

Several commemorations of the event have taken place over the years in Casalecchio, endorsed by the municipality of Casalecchio di Reno, with public talks and events on the themes of safety, solidarity and justice. In 2020, for the 30th anniversary of the disaster, the municipality organised a two weeks long series of events that included ceremonies, photo exhibitions, theatre and music productions, culminating in a livestreamed commemoration with messages from the Italian president Sergio Mattarella and the President of the European Parliament David Sassoli.

References

External links 
 
 Commemorative page on Casalecchio municipality's website (in Italian)
  (in Italian)

1990 disasters in Europe
1990 fires in Europe
1990s trials
20th century in Emilia-Romagna
Accidents and incidents involving military aircraft
Aviation accidents and incidents caused by in-flight fires
Aviation accidents and incidents in 1990
1990 Air Force MB-326 crash
Air Force MB-326 crash
Disasters in Emilia-Romagna
Fires in Italy
Manslaughter trials
Metropolitan City of Bologna
School fire disasters
School fires in Europe
Trials in Italy